Simon van der Geest (born 12 February 1978) is a Dutch writer and poet.

Career 

Van der Geest made his debut as children's writer in 2009 with the book Geel Gras.

He won the Gouden Griffel award twice: in 2011 for his book Dissus and in 2013 for his book Spinder. He also won the Jan Wolkers Prijs 2013 for the book Spinder.

In 2015, he published the book Per ongelukt!, the Kinderboekenweekgeschenk published during the Kinderboekenweek of 2015.

Awards 

 2011: Gouden Griffel, Dissus
 2013: Gouden Griffel, Spinder
 2016: Vlag en Wimpel, Spijkerzwijgen

References

External links 

 Simon van der Geest (in Dutch), Digital Library for Dutch Literature

1978 births
Living people
Dutch children's writers
Dutch male poets
20th-century Dutch male writers
21st-century Dutch male writers
Gouden Griffel winners